Azerbaijan has mandatory military service in the Azerbaijani Armed Forces for all able-bodied male civilians. Conscription is at the age of 18. According to Article 76.2 of the Constitution of Azerbaijan, if a citizen's conscience prevents them from serving, alternative service other than military service is not available. Women between the ages of 19 and 40 are also accepted into the armed forces on a voluntary basis. There are four call-up periods per year. The length of military service is 18 months, the compulsory service period is reduced from 18 to 12 months for university graduates.

Initial military registration of citizens 

Military registration commissions consisting of the chairman of the commission (head of relevant executive authority) and commission members (medical specialists) are established every year. From January to March, male citizens who have reached the age of the 16 must be registered in the relevant military authority and undergo medical examinations. Citizens with a short-term health problem must send to medical institutions for treatment at the expense of the state budget.

Preparing citizens for military service

Pre-conscription training 
Pre-conscription training in Azerbaijan is held in educational institutions. Basic military knowledge is also taught to citizens in parallel with their school lessons.

Training on military occupational specialty 
The citizens who have reached the age of 17 can get training on military occupational specialty in educational institutions. The citizens who want to receive this training must leave their jobs, but they get a salary every month without working during the period of training. And at the end of the training they may return their workplace.

Military service deferment

Permanent deferment 
The following categories of citizens are not required to serve in the armed forces of Azerbaijan:
 People with serious health problems, including the mentally ill
 Citizens who arrested for committing a grave crime
 Being in preventive and operation registration in the police department

Temporary deferment 
Temporary deferment can be given for the following reasons:

Due to the family situation 
 Fathers whose wife is incapable of work and whose children cannot support themselves
 The eldest son in a family, whose members cannot support themselves
 Fathers of more than three children
 The single son in the family, whose one of parent is incapable of work

Due to health problems 
 Citizens with short-term health problems detected during medical examination are given postponements

For continuing  education 
 To citizens under the age of 20 who have completed full-time secondary education in general education institutions
 To citizens under the age of 20 who have not completed full-time secondary education until they enter the institutions of primary function of vocational education
 To citizens who are studying higher education (Bachelor's degree), or higher education for medical education and residency education (until graduation) in the institutions and their branches
 To citizens who are studying in foreign countries in higher education (bachelor's degree), higher education for medical education, and education in residency (internship) until completion of their education

Military ranks 
Military ranks are given to military personnel according to their military position, military education, military service duration, and some other features.

The following military ranks are defined:

See also 
 Azerbaijani Armed Force
 Military ranks insignia of Azerbaijan Land Force
 Military ranks insignia of Azerbaijan Air Force
 Military ranks insignia of Azerbaijan Navy

References 

Military of Azerbaijan
Azebaijan